Ostrov is a municipality and village in Ústí nad Orlicí District in the Pardubice Region of the Czech Republic. It has about 700 inhabitants. Small part of the Lanškroun Ponds Nature Park lies in the municipality.

References

Villages in Ústí nad Orlicí District